The New York Rangers are a professional ice hockey team based in the New York City borough of Manhattan. They compete in the National Hockey League (NHL) as a member of the Metropolitan Division in the Eastern Conference. The team plays its home games at Madison Square Garden, an arena they share with the New York Knicks of the National Basketball Association (NBA). They are one of three NHL teams located in the New York metropolitan area; the others being the New Jersey Devils and New York Islanders.

Founded in 1926 by Tex Rickard, the Rangers are one of the Original Six teams that competed in the NHL before its 1967 expansion, along with the Boston Bruins, Chicago Blackhawks, Detroit Red Wings, Montreal Canadiens and Toronto Maple Leafs. The team attained success early on under the guidance of Lester Patrick, who coached a team containing Frank Boucher, Murray Murdoch, and Bun and Bill Cook to Stanley Cup glory in 1928, making them the first NHL franchise in the United States to win the trophy. The team would then go onto win two additional Stanley Cups in 1933 and 1940.

Following this initial grace period, the franchise struggled between the 1940s and 1960s, wherein playoff appearances and successes were infrequent. The team enjoyed a mini-renaissance in the 1970s, where they made the Stanley Cup finals twice, losing to the Bruins in 1972 and the Canadiens in 1979. The Rangers subsequently embraced a rebuild for much of the 1980s and early 1990s, which eventually paid dividends in 1994, where the team, led by Mark Messier, Brian Leetch, Adam Graves, and Mike Richter, captured their fourth Stanley Cup.

The team was unable to duplicate that success in the years that followed, and entered into another period of mediocrity. They endured a franchise-record seven-year postseason drought from 1998 to 2005 and languished for the majority of the 2000s before enjoying another period of prosperity after the 2004–05 NHL Lockout. After the arrival of goaltender Henrik Lundqvist, the Rangers thrived, missing the playoffs just once between 2006 and 2017. They reached the Stanley Cup Finals in 2014, falling to the Los Angeles Kings in five games.

Several former members of the Rangers have been inducted into the Hockey Hall of Fame, four of whom—Buddy O'Connor, Chuck Rayner, Andy Bathgate, and Messier—have won the Hart Memorial Trophy while playing for the team.

History

Early years (1926–1967)
The Americans' early success in their inaugural season exceeded expectations, leading Rickard to pursue a second team for the Garden despite promising the Amerks that they were going to be the only hockey team to play there. The new team was quickly nicknamed "Tex's Rangers".

Rickard's franchise began play in the 1926–27 season. The first team crest was a horse sketched in blue carrying a cowboy waving a hockey stick aloft, before being changed to the familiar "RANGERS" in diagonal. Future Toronto Maple Leafs owner Conn Smythe was hired to assemble the team, however he had a falling-out with Rickard's hockey man, Col. John S. Hammond, and was fired as manager-coach on the eve of the first season—he was paid a then-hefty $2,500 to leave. Smythe was replaced by Pacific Coast Hockey Association co-founder Lester Patrick. The new team Smythe assembled turned out to be a winner. The Rangers won the American Division title their first year but lost to the Boston Bruins in the playoffs.

The team's early success led to players becoming minor celebrities and fixtures in New York City's Roaring Twenties nightlife. During this time, playing at the Garden on 49th Street, blocks away from Times Square, that the Rangers obtained their nickname "The Broadway Blueshirts". On December 13, 1929, the Rangers became the first team in the NHL to travel by plane when they hired the Curtiss-Wright Corporation to fly them to Toronto for a game against the Maple Leafs, which they lost 7–6.

In only the Rangers' second season, they won the  Stanley Cup, defeating the Montreal Maroons three games to two. One of the most memorable stories that emerged from the finals involved Patrick playing in goal at the age of 44. At the time, teams were not required to dress a backup goaltender. When the Rangers' starting goaltender, Lorne Chabot, left a game with an eye injury, Maroons head coach Eddie Gerard vetoed Patrick's original choice for an emergency replacement, Alex Connell of the Ottawa Senators, who was in attendance. An angry Patrick lined up between the pipes for two periods in Game 2 of the finals, allowing one goal to Maroons center Nels Stewart. Frank Boucher scored the game-winning goal in overtime for New York.

After a loss to the Bruins in the  Stanley Cup Finals and an early struggle in the early 1930s, the Rangers, led by brothers Bill and Bun Cook on the right and left wings, respectively, and Frank Boucher at center, defeated the Maple Leafs in the  best-of-five finals three games to one to win their second Stanley Cup. The Rangers spent the rest of the 1930s playing close to 0.500 hockey until their next Cup win. Lester Patrick stepped down as head coach and was replaced by Frank Boucher.

In their 1939–40 season, the Rangers finished the regular season in second place behind Boston. The two teams then met in the first round of the playoffs. The Bruins gained a two-games-to-one series lead from New York, but the Rangers recovered to win three-straight games, defeating the first-place Bruins four games to two. The Rangers' first-round victory gave them a bye until the finals. The Detroit Red Wings defeated the New York Americans in their first-round best-of-three series two games to one, and the Toronto Maple Leafs ousted the Chicago Black Hawks two games to none. The Maple Leafs then swept Detroit a best-of-three series to advance to the finals. The  Cup Finals commenced in Madison Square Garden. In Game 1, the Rangers needed overtime to gain a 1–0 series lead, but they won game two more easily with a 6–2 victory. The series then shifted to Toronto, where the Maple Leafs won the next two games, tying the series at two games apiece. In Games 5 and 6, the Rangers won in overtime, taking the series four games to two to earn their third Stanley Cup.

However, the Rangers collapsed by the mid-1940s, losing games by scores as lopsided as 15–0. In , goaltender Ken McAuley led the league with 39 losses and 310 goals allowed in 50 games played; his 6.24 goals-against average that year remains the worst in NHL history by a goaltender playing at least 25 games in a season. In the 1950 Stanley Cup Finals, the Rangers were forced to play all of their games, including "home" games, in Toronto, while the circus was held at the Garden. They lost to the Detroit Red Wings in overtime in the seventh game of the finals.

During this time, Red Wings owner James E. Norris became the largest stockholder in the Garden. However, he did not buy controlling interest in the arena, which would have violated the NHL's rule against one person owning more than one team. Nonetheless, he had enough support on the board to exercise de facto control. The Rangers remained a mark of futility in the NHL for most of the remainder of the Original Six era, missing the playoffs in 12 of the next 16 years. However, the team was rejuvenated in the late 1960s, symbolized by moving into the fourth version of Madison Square Garden in 1968. A year earlier, they made the playoffs for the first time in five years on the strength of rookie goaltender Eddie Giacomin and 37-year-old former 1950s Montreal Canadiens star right wing Bernie "Boom Boom" Geoffrion, signed out of retirement in 1966.

Post-Original Six era (1967–1993)

The Rangers reached the 1971 Stanley Cup Finals despite losing high-scoring center Jean Ratelle (who had been on pace over Bruin Phil Esposito to become the first Ranger since Bryan Hextall in 1942 to lead the NHL in scoring) to injury during the stretch drive of the regular season. The strength of players such as Brad Park, Jean Ratelle, Vic Hadfield and Rod Gilbert (the last three constructing the famed "GAG line", standing for "goal-a-game") carried them through the playoffs. They defeated the defending-champion Canadiens in the first round and the Chicago Black Hawks in the second, but lost to the Bruins in the finals.

In the 1972 playoffs, with Ratelle sidelined with a broken ankle and Gilbert hampered by injuries, Walt Tkaczuk played a key role as the Rangers defeated the defending champion Canadiens and the previous year's finalists, the Black Hawks, to reach the  Stanley Cup Finals. While the Rangers lost to the Boston Bruins in six games, Tkaczuk earned much respect for holding the Bruins' Phil Esposito without a goal in the series.

The Rangers played a legendary conference semi-final series against the Philadelphia Flyers in the  playoffs, losing in seven games and becoming the first Original Six club to lose a playoff series to a 1967 expansion team. This series was noted for a Game 7 fight between Dale Rolfe of the Rangers and Dave Schultz of the Flyers. The Rangers' new rivals, the New York Islanders, who entered the League in  after paying a hefty territorial fee – some $4 million – to the Rangers, were their first-round opponents in the  playoffs. After splitting the first two games, the Islanders defeated the more-established Rangers 11 seconds into overtime of the deciding Game 3, establishing a rivalry that continued to grow for years.

In the 1979 NHL playoffs, New York defeated the surging Islanders in the conference semi-finals and advanced to the  Cup Finals, losing to the Canadiens. In the three consecutive  through  playoffs, the Rangers were eliminated by the rival Islanders, who went on to win the Stanley Cup each of those years.

The Rangers stayed competitive through the 1980s and early 1990s, making the playoffs each year. In the 1986 Stanley Cup playoffs, the Rangers, behind the play of rookie goaltender John Vanbiesbrouck, upended the Patrick Division-winning Flyers in five games followed by a six-game win over the Washington Capitals in the Patrick Division finals. Montreal, however, disposed of the Rangers in the Wales Conference finals behind a rookie goaltender of their own, Patrick Roy. For the 1986–87 New York Rangers season, the team acquired superstar center Marcel Dionne after almost 12 years with the Los Angeles Kings. In 1988, while a Ranger, Dionne moved into third place in NHL career goals scored.

Frustration was at its peak when the 1991–92 Rangers captured the Presidents' Trophy. They took a 2–1 series lead on the defending champion Pittsburgh Penguins and then faltered in three-straight (some observers note a Ron Francis slapshot from outside the blue line that eluded goaltender Mike Richter as the series' turning point). The following year, injuries and a 1–11 regular season finish landed the Rangers at the bottom of the Patrick Division after being in a playoff position for much of the season. Head coach Roger Neilson did not finish the season.

During this period, the Rangers were owned by Gulf+Western, which was renamed to Paramount Communications in 1989, and sold to Viacom in 1994. Viacom then sold the team to ITT Corporation and Cablevision, and a couple of years later, ITT sold their ownership stake to Cablevision, who owned the team until 2010, when they spun off the MSG properties as their own company.

Ending the curse (1993–94)
The 1993–94 New York Rangers season was their most successful in 54 years, as Mike Keenan coached the Rangers to the  Stanley Cup championship, winning their fourth Cup. By the 1993–94 season, the Rangers had acquired seven players who had been part of the Edmonton Oilers' Cup-winning teams: Oilers captain (and new Rangers captain) Mark Messier, Adam Graves, Kevin Lowe, Jeff Beukeboom, Esa Tikkanen, Craig MacTavish and Glenn Anderson. Graves set a team record with 52 goals, breaking the prior record of 50 held by Vic Hadfield. The Rangers clinched the Presidents' Trophy by finishing with the best record in the NHL at 52–24–8, setting a franchise record with 112 points earned.

The Rangers successfully made it past the first two rounds of the playoffs, sweeping the New York Islanders, and then defeating the Washington Capitals in five games. However, in the conference finals against the third-seeded New Jersey Devils, the Rangers lost the series opener at home in double overtime, but won the next two games before the Devils defeated them 3–1 and 4–1. The series headed back to the Meadowlands for the sixth game, in which Messier scored three times in the final period to lead the Rangers to a 4–2 win and set up a seventh game back at Madison Square Garden. The Rangers won Game 7, 2–1, when Stephane Matteau scored a goal in double overtime, leading the team to the finals for the first time since .

Up against the Vancouver Canucks, the Rangers again lost the series opener at home in overtime. The Rangers bounced back and they won the next three games, allowing the Canucks just four goals. However, the Canucks won the next two 6–3 and 4–1 to set up a seventh game, for the second consecutive series, at home. In the seventh game, the Rangers took a 2–0 first period lead, with Messier scoring later to put the Rangers up 3–1, the eventual Cup winning goal as the home team won 3–2, becoming the first (and to this date, only) player to captain two teams to the Stanley Cup. Brian Leetch became the first American-born player to win the Conn Smythe Trophy as playoff MVP, while Alexander Karpovtsev, Alexei Kovalev, Sergei Nemchinov and Sergei Zubov became the first Russians to have their names engraved on the Cup.

Expensive acquisitions and post-season drought (1995–2005)
Despite having coached the Rangers to a regular season first-place finish and the Stanley Cup victory, head coach Mike Keenan left after a dispute with general manager Neil Smith. During the lockout-shortened , the Rangers won their first-round series with the Quebec Nordiques, but lost in the second round of the playoffs to the Philadelphia Flyers in four games with succeeding head coach Colin Campbell. General manager Neil Smith orchestrated a deal that sent Sergei Zubov and center Petr Nedved to Pittsburgh in exchange for defenseman Ulf Samuelsson and left-winger Luc Robitaille in the summer of 1995. The 1995–96 Rangers defeated the Canadiens in six games in the playoffs, but lost their second-round series to the Penguins in five games.

The Rangers then acquired Wayne Gretzky in 1996. Gretzky's greatest accomplishment with the Rangers was leading them to the 1997 Eastern Conference finals, where they lost 4–1 to the Flyers, who were then led by Eric Lindros. Mark Messier, a former Oiler teammate of Gretzky's, left in the summer of 1997 and the team failed in a bid to replace him with Colorado Avalanche superstar Joe Sakic. The Rangers missed the playoffs for seven consecutive seasons, finishing no higher than fourth in their division.

In March 2000, Smith was fired along with head coach John Muckler, and that summer, James Dolan hired Glen Sather to replace him. Messier had returned to New York, Theoren Fleury joined the Rangers after spending most of his career with the Calgary Flames and Eric Lindros was traded to the Rangers by the Flyers. It was also the rookie season of goalie Dan Blackburn, who made the NHL All-Rookie Team even as the Rangers fell back to last place in the Conference, and finished out of the playoffs. Blackburn started strongly in 2002–03, but burned out after 17 games. He missed 2003–04 due to mononucleosis and a damaged nerve in his left shoulder. Blackburn could not rehabilitate the damaged nerve, and was forced to retire at the age of 22. Towards the end of the 2003–04 New York Rangers season, general manager Glen Sather finally gave in to a rebuilding process by trading away Brian Leetch, Alexei Kovalev, and eight others for numerous prospects and draft picks. With the retirements of Pavel Bure and Mark Messier, as well as Eric Lindros signing with the Toronto Maple Leafs, the post-lockout Rangers, under new head coach Tom Renney, moved away from high-priced veterans towards a group of talented young players, such as Petr Prucha, Dominic Moore and Blair Betts.

Henrik Lundqvist era (2005–2020)
 
Jagr broke the Rangers' single-season points record with a first-period assist in a 5–1 win against the New York Islanders on March 29, 2006. The assist gave him 110 points on the season, breaking Jean Ratelle's record. Less than two weeks later, on April 8, Jagr scored his 53rd goal of the season against the Boston Bruins, breaking the club record previously held by Adam Graves. Two games prior, on April 4, the Rangers defeated the Philadelphia Flyers 3–2, in a shootout, to clinch a playoff spot for the first time since . In the Eastern Conference quarterfinals, the Rangers drew a matchup with the Devils and were defeated in a four-game sweep. Jagr fell two points short of winning his sixth Art Ross Trophy as scoring champion in 2005–06 (the trophy went to the San Jose Sharks' Joe Thornton), but Jagr did win his third Pearson Award as the players' choice for the most outstanding player.

 Realizing that the team had trouble scoring goals in the 2005–06 campaign, the Rangers signed Triple Gold Club winner and 12-time 30-goal scorer Brendan Shanahan to a one-year contract. Though the Rangers started slow in the first half of the 2006–07 season, the second half was dominated by the stellar goaltending of Henrik Lundqvist. On February 5, 2007, the Rangers acquired agitating forward Sean Avery in a trade with the Los Angeles Kings, which brought further intensity to the team. Despite losing several players to injury in March, the Rangers went 10–2–3 in the month and clinched a playoff berth for the second consecutive season. Facing the Atlanta Thrashers in the first round of the 2007 playoffs, the Rangers swept the series. However, they were eliminated in the next round by the Buffalo Sabres.
At the 2007 NHL Entry Draft, the Rangers chose Alexei Cherepanov 17th overall, who had been ranked by the NHL Central Scouting Bureau as the number one European skater. Despite the departure of Michael Nylander, the 2007 free agency season started with a bang for the Rangers, with the signing of two high-profile centerman; Scott Gomez on a seven-year contract, as well as Chris Drury on a five-year deal. The moves, along with retaining most other key players, had been met favorably, and the Rangers made the playoffs for the third consecutive season and the second round for the second season in a row. Despite these streaks, the Rangers failed to meet expectations, losing their second-round series to the Pittsburgh Penguins. The following off-season saw the departures of captain Jaromir Jagr to the KHL, and alternate captains Martin Straka and Brendan Shanahan, who left to play in the Czech Republic and with the New Jersey Devils, respectively.

Following Jagr's departure, Chris Drury was named captain on October 3, 2008. This was followed by two NHL regular season games against Tampa Bay in Prague on October 4 and 5, and the Rangers won both games. The Rangers tied the 1983–84 Rangers for the best start in franchise history with a 5–0 record, and set the franchise record for best start in a season through the first 13 games by going 10–2–1 for 21 points, with the 10 wins and 21 points each becoming franchise records. A successful start to the season, however, was tempered with by the news of the sudden death of 2007 first-round pick Alexei Cherepanov, which occurred during a KHL game in Russia on October 13, 2008. A disappointing second half of the season followed. After the Rangers went 2–7–3 in 12 games, coach Tom Renney was fired, with  Stanley Cup and Jack Adams Award winner John Tortorella named as his replacement. The Rangers made the 2009 playoffs, but lost their opening-round series to the Washington Capitals four games to three.
 
On June 30, 2009, the Rangers traded Scott Gomez, Tom Pyatt, and Michael Busto to the Montreal Canadiens for Ryan McDonagh, Chris Higgins, Pavel Valentenko, and Doug Janik. With Gomez's salary cap hit gone, the Rangers signed superstar Marian Gaborik on the first day of free agency. There was some criticism that the off-season acquisition of Gaborik had not paid off, despite Gaborik scoring 42 goals and 86 points in the season. The final two games of the season were a home-and-home against the Philadelphia Flyers, with both teams competing for the same playoff spot. The Rangers skated away with the victory in the first game, keeping their post-season hopes alive. In the second game, the Flyers peppered Henrik Lundqvist with 47 shots, but scored only once. The game went to a shootout, and the Flyers prevailed to move on to the playoffs.

For the 2010–11 New York Rangers season, the team waived defenseman Wade Redden and brought in several players to achieve more balanced scoring. On November 12, the Rangers unveiled the new Heritage Jersey for the first time at the ice rink at Rockefeller Center in a special ceremony featuring Rangers alumni and current players discussing the history of the storied franchise. The club wore the jersey for the first time on November 17 when they played the Boston Bruins at Madison Square Garden. The Rangers' playoff chances came down to the final day of the regular season for the second-straight year. The team defeated the New Jersey Devils and passed the Carolina Hurricanes in the standings, putting the Rangers in the playoffs after missing out the previous season. The Rangers faced Washington in the first round and lost the series in five games. It was the second time in three years that the Capitals eliminated the Rangers from the playoffs, fueling a rivalry that would last several seasons.

On May 13, 2011, Rangers forward Derek Boogaard was found dead in his Minnesota apartment. On June 29, 2011, the Rangers bought out captain Chris Drury's contract. On July 2, 2011, the Rangers signed free agent Brad Richards to a nine-year contract. On September 12, 2011, Ryan Callahan was named the 26th captain in the Rangers' history. He became the fifth-youngest captain in team history. Brad Richards and Marc Staal were named alternate captains on the same day.

In the 2011–12 New York Rangers season, the team finished as the top seed in the Eastern Conference, recording 51 wins and 109 points. Their leading scorer was Marian Gaborik, who finished the season with 41 goals and 76 points while playing all 82 games. In the first round of the playoffs, the Rangers faced the eighth-seeded Ottawa Senators. After falling behind 3–2 in the series, the Rangers bounced back to win Game 6 in Ottawa as well as Game 7 at home. In the next round, the Rangers once again faced the Capitals. In Game 3, Gaborik scored to win 14:41 into the third overtime, giving the Rangers a 2–1 lead in the series, but Washington came back to tie the series 2–2 in Game 4. Washington was up by one during the final minutes of Game 5 when Joel Ward committed a high-sticking double-minor. Richards scored to tie with just 6.6 seconds remaining, and in overtime, defenseman Marc Staal scored on the second penalty of the double-minor just 1:35 into overtime. Rangers went on to win the series 4–3, sending them to the Eastern Conference finals for the first time since 1997. In the conference finals, they faced the New Jersey Devils, a major divisional rival. After leading the series 2–1, the Rangers lost 3 games in a row, losing Game 6 in New Jersey with a goal by Devils forward Adam Henrique at 1:03 in overtime, giving the Devils a 4–2 series win and ending the Rangers' season.

Return to the Finals and third Presidents' Trophy
On July 23, 2012, the Rangers traded Brandon Dubinsky, Artem Anisimov, Tim Erixon and a 2013 first-round draft pick to the Columbus Blue Jackets in exchange for Rick Nash, Steven Delisle, and a 2013 conditional third-round pick. At the 2013 NHL trade deadline on April 3, the Rangers then traded Marian Gaborik and Steven Delisle to Columbus for Derick Brassard, Derek Dorsett, John Moore, and a 2014 sixth-round draft pick. After the Rangers were eliminated in the second round of the playoffs by Boston, management fired head coach John Tortorella, and on June 21, 2013, general manager Glen Sather formally introduced former Canucks head coach Alain Vigneault as Tortorella's replacement.

A trade late in the  contributed to the Rangers reaching the  Stanley Cup Finals. On March 5, 2014, the Rangers traded their captain Ryan Callahan, along with a first-round draft pick in 2015, a conditional second-round pick in 2014, and a conditional seventh-round pick in 2015, for Tampa Bay captain Martin St. Louis. The trade occurred both due to the Rangers' and Callahan's inability to reach a contract extension, as well as St. Louis' growing tension with the Lightning organization and subsequent request to be traded to New York. The 2013–14 Rangers were already a strong team, setting a new franchise record of 25 road game wins. New York defeated Philadelphia in seven games in the first round of the 2014 playoffs, and in the next round rallied from a 3–1 series deficit for the first time in their history to defeat Pittsburgh in seven games. They then defeated the Montreal Canadiens in six games to become the Eastern Conference champions, moving on to the Cup Finals, their first visit in 20 years, to face  champions Los Angeles Kings. The Rangers led the first two games by two goals but lost each game in overtime, and were then shut-out at home 3–0 in Game 3. The Kings outshot the Rangers in Game 4, but the Rangers staved off elimination by winning the game 2–1. They had another lead in Game 5, but after the game was tied and subsequently sent to overtime, Kings defenseman Alec Martinez scored with 5:17 left in the second overtime period to win the game for Los Angeles, 3–2, as well as the Stanley Cup. On June 20, 2014, a week after their season ended, the Rangers bought-out the remaining six years of Brad Richards' contract in order to free up salary cap space. On October 6, 2014, defenseman Ryan McDonagh was named the Rangers' 27th captain in team history, with Derek Stepan, Dan Girardi, Marc Staal and Martin St. Louis serving as alternates.

In , the Rangers won the Presidents' Trophy for the third time in franchise history and their seventh division title by finishing with the best record in the NHL at 53–22–7. The 53 wins and 113 points both set franchise records. The team also won 28 road games in the regular season, breaking the franchise record set the previous season. In the 2015 Stanley Cup playoffs, the Rangers dispatched the Pittsburgh Penguins in five games in the first round. The Rangers then came back from a 3–1 series deficit to win their second-round series against the Capitals in seven games, becoming the first team in NHL history to battle back from a 3–1 deficit in back-to-back seasons and sending the Rangers to the Eastern Conference Final for the third time in four years. However, after winning the first game against the Tampa Bay Lightning, the Rangers lost Game 2 by four goals. The two teams split the first four games of the series, but the Rangers lost Game 5 by a 2–0 scoreline at home. In Game 6, Derick Brassard scored a hat-trick and assisted on two other goals in an emphatic 7–3 Rangers victory to force Game 7 in New York. There, the Lightning shutout the Rangers 2–0, ending the Rangers' season, and marking the first occasion the Rangers had ever lost a Game 7 at home in franchise history as well as the first time they lost an elimination game at home since they lost to Buffalo in 2007.

Jeff Gorton's rebuild
On June 27, 2015, the Rangers traded Carl Hagelin to the Anaheim Ducks, Cam Talbot and a draft pick to the Edmonton Oilers, and prospect Ryan Haggerty to the Chicago Blackhawks for Antti Raanta, who replaced Talbot as Lundqvist's backup goaltender. Subsequently, on July 1, 2015, Glen Sather resigned as the general manager, with Jeff Gorton taking his place to become the 11th general manager in team history. On July 2, 2015, Martin St. Louis announced his retirement. The team then re-signed Jesper Fast, J. T. Miller, and Derek Stepan.

However, the team lost their momentum and floundered, posting a 4–7–2 record in December for only ten points. After the holiday break, the team gradually improved their play, going on a 10–3–1 run without any back-to-back losses in February. The Rangers finished the season with 101 points for back-to-back 100+ point seasons. Despite high hopes, the Rangers were eliminated in the first round of the 2016 Stanley Cup playoffs by a Penguins team that would go on to win the Stanley Cup. That summer, the Rangers extended Antti Raanta's contract, signed Pavel Buchnevich to an entry-level contract, and re-signed J. T. Miller, Chris Kreider, and Kevin Hayes.

On July 18, the Rangers traded Derick Brassard and a 2018 seventh-round draft pick in exchange for Mika Zibanejad and a 2018 second-round draft pick, The team also signed Michael Grabner to a two-year deal and the much-anticipated college sensation Jimmy Vesey to a two-year entry-level contract. The Rangers finished  in fourth place in the Metropolitan Division with 102 points. In the first round of the 2017 Stanley Cup playoffs, they won their series with the Montreal Canadiens in six games. In the second game of their second-round series with the Ottawa Senators, the Rangers held a two-goal lead on three different occasions, but lost in double overtime, putting themselves in a 2–0 series deficit. The team responded with consecutive 4–1 home wins in Games 3 and 4 to tie the series at two games apiece. However, the Rangers lost the next two games and were eliminated by the Senators.

On June 14, 2017, the Rangers announced a buyout of Dan Girardi's contract. Just over a week later, the Rangers traded Derek Stepan and Antti Raanta to the Arizona Coyotes in exchange for a first-round draft pick (seventh overall) and former first-round pick Tony DeAngelo. The Rangers' management was also successful in signing top free agent defenseman Kevin Shattenkirk on July 1, 2017, to a four-year deal. With injuries sidelining Shattenkirk, Kreider, and Zibanejad, the Rangers struggled to compete. By February 8, 2018, the team had a 25–24–5 record, leading the front office to issue a letter to fans announcing the Rangers would be committing to a rebuild and may "lose some familiar faces" in the process. Rick Nash was traded the day before the 2018 NHL trade deadline to the Bruins for a 2018 first-round pick, a 2019 seventh-round pick, Matt Beleskey, Ryan Spooner and Ryan Lindgren. The following day, the Rangers traded captain Ryan McDonagh and J. T. Miller to the Tampa Bay Lightning for Vladislav Namestnikov, prospects Brett Howden and Libor Hajek, and multiple draft picks. With the team missing the playoffs for the first time since 2010, finishing under .500 for the first time since 2004, and placing last in the Metropolitan Division, head coach Vigneault was fired after the conclusion of the season.

On May 23, David Quinn was hired as the team's new head coach. During the off-season, Hayes, Vesey, Brady Skjei and Spooner all filed for salary arbitration and all of them were re-signed. Despite a mediocre 2018–19 season, Gorton and his team remained committed to rebuilding the franchise. 2017 first-round draft pick Filip Chytil made his NHL debut, and early in the season Ryan Spooner was traded to Edmonton for Ryan Strome. With the trade deadline approaching and their playoff chances slim, the Rangers once again traded away veteran players, with fan-favorite Mats Zuccarello being sent to the Dallas Stars in exchange for two draft picks and Kevin Hayes going to Winnipeg in exchange for a first-round pick, a conditional pick, and forward Brendan Lemieux.

The Rangers received the second overall pick in the 2019 NHL Entry Draft, and subsequently used it to select forward Kaapo Kakko. On May 17, 2019, former Ranger goaltender and broadcaster John Davidson resigned from his position as president of the Columbus Blue Jackets and returned to New York to become the organization's new president. Davidson and Gorton addressed the team's defensive woes by acquiring top prospect Adam Fox from Carolina for a pair of picks, as well as veteran defenseman Jacob Trouba. The team also signed free agent Artemi Panarin to a seven-year deal on July 1, 2019. To help with salary cap restrictions, the Rangers then traded Jimmy Vesey and bought out the last two years of Shattenkirk's contract.

The  was a step forward for the rebuilding Rangers; Panarin lived up expectations and earned a Hart Trophy nomination, rookie goaltender Igor Shestyorkin proved to be a worthy successor to aging superstar Henrik Lundqvist, Chris Kreider signed a seven-year contract extension, and Mika Zibanejad emerged as an elite forward, recording a 5-goal-game against Washington on March 5 and ending up with 41 goals in 57 games played. By early March 2020, the Rangers were within striking distance of the second wild-card position when the coronavirus pandemic halted the regular season. In May 2020, the league announced a 24-team playoff tournament to complete the season, where the Rangers were seeded eleventh and faced the Carolina Hurricanes; the Hurricanes swept the Rangers. After being eliminated from the playoffs the Rangers were entered into the second phase of the NHL draft lottery where the team won the lottery and were awarded the first pick in the 2020 NHL Entry Draft, which Gorton used to select Alexis Lafreniere. Later in the off-season, the team traded veteran defenseman Marc Staal to the Red Wings.

In September 2020, the Rangers bought out the final year of Henrik Lundqvist's contract, ending his tenure in New York after 15 years.

The Drury years (2021–present)
On January 31, 2021, defenseman Tony DeAngelo was placed on waivers by the Rangers, following reports that he had an altercation with teammate Alexandar Georgiev following an overtime loss to the Pittsburgh Penguins. According to The Athletic, his continued "maturity" issues, combined with a marked decline in his play, led the Rangers to put him on the market; there were no takers.

In a game against the Washington Capitals on May 3, 2021, Capitals forward Tom Wilson cross-checked Pavel Buchnevich in the head and slammed Artemi Panarin into the ice, ending his season. Wilson, a repeat offender, was fined the league maximum of $5,000 for the incident. The Rangers organization released a statement expressing disappointment in this decision, calling head of player safety George Parros "unfit to continue in his current role". The NHL subsequently fined the Rangers $250,000 for their comments. Two days later, Rangers owner James Dolan fired president John Davidson and general manager Jeff Gorton. Despite the timing, Dolan stated the firings were not related to the Wilson incident and statement, citing "culture" issues within the organization. Chris Drury was then announced as the Rangers' new president and general manager. On May 12, Drury fired head coach David Quinn after the team failed to qualify for the 2021 Stanley Cup playoffs. Despite a tumultuous season, a major bright spot was the play of Adam Fox; he led NHL defensemen with 42 assists, finished second in points with 47, and won the James Norris Memorial Trophy.

On June 16, 2021, the Rangers named Gerard Gallant as their head coach. 

In the 2021–22 season, the Rangers finished the regular season with a record of 52–24–6, making the playoffs for the first time since the 2017 season. For the third time in franchise history, the Rangers overcame a 3–1 series deficit, this time against the Pittsburgh Penguins in a first round matchup that concluded with a game-winning overtime goal from Artemi Panarin. In the next round, they would defeat the Carolina Hurricanes in seven games after trailing 2–0 and 3–2 in the series, advancing to their first Eastern Conference Finals since 2015. In the Eastern Conference Finals, they faced the back-to-back defending champions Tampa Bay Lightning, and lost the series despite a 2–0 series lead. Igor Shesterkin was named the Vezina Trophy winner following the season.

Uniforms

The classic Rangers sweater has been in use since the franchise's foundation, with several alterations along the way. The current blue uniform has the serifed word "RANGERS" in red and white drop shadow arranged diagonally, with red and white stripes on the sleeves and tail. Originally, the uniform was light blue, before it switched to a darker classic Rangers "Broadway Blue" in 1929. In addition, the original versions neither had a drop shadow nor were serifed. During the 1946–47 season, the word "RANGERS" was arranged in an arch form above the sweater number. It adopted its current form the next season, along with dropshadowed numbers, except for a brief period where the city name was used, a tie-down collar was not used and the tail and sleeve stripes were separated by thin blue stripes. Red pants have been used with the uniform since the 1929–30 season.

The white jerseys were first unveiled in the 1951–52 season, as part of a mandate that regulated NHL teams to have a dark home jersey and a light away jersey. The serifed word "RANGERS" is also arranged diagonally, but in blue with red drop shadow. A quinticolor of blue, white and red stripes accentuate the tail and sleeves, while a blue shoulder yoke with white and red stripes completes the look. The white sweaters, with minor changes such as a tie-down collar and arched player names, have remained virtually unchanged since.

During the tenure of general manager John Ferguson Sr., he sought to modernize the Rangers sweater by featuring rounded numbers, a darker shade of blue and the shield logo, which was unveiled in the 1976–77 season. A blue and red stripe (white and red stripe in the blue sweaters) extend from the yoke to the sleeves, while blue pants were used. However, it proved unpopular with the fans, and following the 1977–78 season it was replaced by an updated version of their classic uniforms. Ferguson used this similar design when he became GM of the original Winnipeg Jets.

The modernized classic uniforms introduced in 1978 featured some subtle changes. Both jerseys featured a V-neck collar in a red-white-red pattern, and bolder stripes on the sleeves and waistline. On the blue jersey, the red and white stripes were separated by thin blue stripes, along with the waistline stripes being raised above the hemline so that the patterns on both jerseys matched. From 1978 to 1987, the blue jersey (then the road jersey) featured "NEW YORK" diagonally across the front instead of the traditional "RANGERS" wordmark, similar to their 2010s heritage alternate jerseys. In 1997, the Rangers reverted the blue jersey's design, restoring the old striping pattern, and becoming the first team to re-introduce lace-up collars. The white jerseys followed suit in 1999, and the design was carried over to the Reebok Edge template in 2007.

On October 7, 2001, the Rangers wore a modified version of their blue jerseys in a home game against the Buffalo Sabres. This design combined the current/traditional striping with the "NEW YORK" wordmark of the 1978–1987 uniforms. The uniforms were worn in the wake of the September 11 attacks.

The Rangers previously had a navy alternate jersey featuring the head of the Statue of Liberty with the team abbreviation (NYR) below in a futuristic script. Silver was used as an accent color, but the player names and numbers retain the same color schemes as the regular jerseys, except for a darker shade of blue. Other than a white version used in the 1998–99 season, this jersey was used from 1996 to 2007, and proved to be highly popular with fans.

During the 2010–11 season, the Rangers debuted a heritage blue jersey as their new alternate uniform. The jersey featured a darker shade of blue, as well as a cream trim. Unlike the regular jerseys, the font of the alternate is in sans-serif and does not feature a dropshadow, much like the original Rangers jersey. The Rangers wore the jerseys at home on Saturdays and when they played against Original Six teams. For the 2017–18 season, the heritage jersey was retired because of the league-wide switch to the Adidas uniform format.

In the 2012 NHL Winter Classic, the Rangers wore a cream jersey combining classic and current styles. A different version of the shield logo was used, while the player names were arranged in a straight line. The stripes were also lessened, giving it a minimalist, vintage look, as most Winter Classic jerseys are.

For the 2014 NHL Stadium Series, the Rangers used white jerseys with the city name in navy, silver and red. In addition, they feature diagonal stripes and sleeve numbers, and enlarged numbers on the back to make them more readable to spectators. The chrome version of the shield logo is placed in the left shoulder. Like the Winter Classic sweaters, player names are in a straight position.

The 2018 NHL Winter Classic saw the Rangers wear a navy jersey with a combination of elements from prior uniform designs. The striping design was inspired from their current uniforms, while the white "RANGERS" wordmark was a nod from the team's late 1920s jerseys. A white silhouette of the Rangers' shield logo contained either the abbreviation "N.Y." or the alternate captain "A" and captain "C" designations. Player names are arranged in a straight position.

During the 2020–21 season, the Rangers released a "Reverse Retro" alternate uniform in collaboration with Adidas. The uniform featured the "Lady Liberty" design worn from 1996 to 2007, but with a few changes in the striping. This same design was again used for their 2022–23 "Reverse Retro" uniform, but the lighter Broadway Blue served as the base color while the lower sleeves were recolored red with white and navy stripes.

Season-by-season record
This is a partial list of the last five seasons completed by the Rangers. For the full season-by-season history, see List of New York Rangers seasons.

Note: GP = Games played, W = Wins, L = Losses, T = Ties, OTL = Overtime/shootout losses, Pts = Points, GF = Goals for, GA = Goals against

Players and personnel

Current roster

Team captains

 Bill Cook, 1926–1937
 Art Coulter, 1937–1942
 Ott Heller, 1942–1945
 Neil Colville, 1945–1948
 Buddy O'Connor, 1949–1950
 Frank Eddolls, 1950–1951
 Allan Stanley, 1951–1953
 Don Raleigh, 1953–1955
 Harry Howell, 1955–1957
 George Sullivan, 1957–1961
 Andy Bathgate, 1961–1964
 Camille Henry, 1964–1965
 Bob Nevin, 1965–1971
 Vic Hadfield, 1971–1974
 Brad Park, 1974–1975
 Phil Esposito, 1975–1978
 Dave Maloney, 1978–1980
 Walt Tkaczuk, 1980–1981
 Barry Beck, 1981–1986
 Ron Greschner, 1986–1987
 Kelly Kisio, 1987–1991
 Mark Messier, 1991–1997
 Brian Leetch, 1997–2000
 Mark Messier, 2000–2004
 Jaromir Jagr, 2006–2008
 Chris Drury, 2008–2011
 Ryan Callahan, 2011–2014
 Ryan McDonagh, 2014–2018
 Jacob Trouba, 2022–present

General managers

The current general manager is Chris Drury, who had been named on May 5, 2021.

Head coaches

The current head coach is Gerard Gallant, who has served since June 16, 2021.

Team and league honors

Awards and trophies

The following lists the league awards which have been won by the Rangers team and its players and alumni:

Stanley Cup
 1927–28, 1932–33, 1939–40, 1993–94

Victoria Cup
 2008 Victoria Cup

Presidents' Trophy
 1991–92, 1993–94, 2014–15

Prince of Wales Trophy
 1931–32, 1941–42, 1993–94, 2013–14

O'Brien Cup
 1949–50

Bill Masterton Memorial Trophy
 Jean Ratelle: 1970–71
 Rod Gilbert: 1975–76
 Anders Hedberg: 1984–85
 Adam Graves: 2000–01
 Dominic Moore: 2013–14

Calder Memorial Trophy
 Kilby MacDonald: 1939–40
 Grant Warwick: 1941–42
 Edgar Laprade: 1945–46
 Pentti Lund: 1948–49
 Gump Worsley: 1952–53
 Camille Henry: 1953–54
 Steve Vickers: 1972–73
 Brian Leetch: 1988–89

Conn Smythe Trophy
 Brian Leetch: 1993–94

Hart Memorial Trophy
 Buddy O'Connor: 1947–48
 Chuck Rayner: 1949–50
 Andy Bathgate: 1958–59
 Mark Messier: 1991–92

James Norris Memorial Trophy
 Doug Harvey: 1961–62
 Harry Howell: 1966–67
 Brian Leetch: 1991–92, 1996–97
 Adam Fox: 2020–21

King Clancy Memorial Trophy
 Adam Graves: 1993–94

Lady Byng Memorial Trophy
 Frank Boucher: 1927–28, 1928–29, 1929–30, 1930–31, 1932–33, 1933–34, 1934–35
 Clint Smith: 1938–39
 Buddy O'Connor: 1947–48
 Edgar Laprade: 1949–50
 Andy Hebenton: 1956–57
 Camille Henry: 1957–58
 Jean Ratelle: 1971–72, 1975–76
 Wayne Gretzky: 1998–99

Lester Patrick Trophy
 John Kilpatrick & Tommy Lockhart: 1967–68
 William M. Jennings & Terry Sawchuk: 1970–71
 Murray Murdoch: 1973–74
 Bill Chadwick: 1974–75
 Phil Esposito: 1977–78
 Fred Shero: 1979–80
 Emile Francis: 1981–82
 Lynn Patrick: 1988–89
 Rod Gilbert: 1990–91
 Frank Boucher: 1992–93
 Wayne Gretzky: 1993–94
 Brian Mullen: 1994–95
 Pat LaFontaine: 1996–97
 Craig Patrick: 1999–00
 Herb Brooks & Larry Pleau: 2001–02
 John Davidson: 2003–04
 Red Berenson & Marcel Dionne: 2005–06
 Brian Leetch & John Halligan: 2006–07
 Mark Messier & Mike Richter: 2008–09
 Bob Crocker: 2014–15
 Jack Blatherwick: 2018–19

Lester B. Pearson Award
 Jean Ratelle: 1971–72
 Mark Messier: 1991–92
 Jaromir Jagr: 2005–06

NHL Plus-Minus Award
 Michal Rozsival: 2005–06  (shared with Wade Redden of the Ottawa Senators) 

Vezina Trophy
 Dave Kerr: 1939–40
 Eddie Giacomin & Gilles Villemure: 1970–71
 John Vanbiesbrouck: 1985–86
 Henrik Lundqvist: 2011–12
 Igor Shesterkin: 2021–22

First-round draft picks

 1963: Al Osborne (4th overall)
 1964: Bob Graham (3rd overall)
 1965: Andre Veilleux (1st overall)
 1966: Brad Park (2nd overall)
 1967: Bob Dickson (6th overall)
 1968: none
 1969: Andre Dupont (8th overall) & Pierre Jarry (12th)
 1970: Norm Gratton (11th overall)
 1971: Steve Vickers (10th overall) & Steve Durbano (13th)
 1972: Al Blanchard (10th overall) & Bob MacMillan (15th)
 1973: Rick Middleton (14th overall)
 1974: Dave Maloney (14th overall)
 1975: Wayne Dillon (12th overall)
 1976: Don Murdoch (6th overall)
 1977: Lucien DeBlois (8th overall) & Ron Duguay (13th)
 1978: none
 1979: Doug Sulliman (13th overall)
 1980: Jim Malone (14th overall)
 1981: James Patrick (9th overall)
 1982: Chris Kontos (15th overall)
 1983: Dave Gagner (12th overall)
 1984: Terry Carkner (14th overall)
 1985: Ulf Dahlen (7th overall)
 1986: Brian Leetch (9th overall)
 1987: Jayson More (10th overall)
 1988: none
 1989: Steven Rice (20th overall)
 1990: Michael Stewart (13th overall)
 1991: Alexei Kovalev (15th overall)
 1992: Peter Ferraro (24th overall)
 1993: Niklas Sundstrom (8th overall)
 1994: Dan Cloutier (26th overall)
 1995: none
 1996: Jeff Brown (22nd overall)
 1997: Stefan Cherneski (19th overall)
 1998: Manny Malhotra (7th overall)
 1999: Pavel Brendl (4th overall) & Jamie Lundmark (9th)
 2000: none
 2001: Dan Blackburn (10th overall)
 2002: none
 2003: Hugh Jessiman (12th overall)
 2004: Al Montoya (6th overall) & Lauri Korpikoski (19th)
 2005: Marc Staal (12th overall)
 2006: Bob Sanguinetti (21st overall)
 2007: Alexei Cherepanov (17th overall)
 2008: Michael Del Zotto (20th overall)
 2009: Chris Kreider (19th overall)
 2010: Dylan McIlrath (10th overall)
 2011: J. T. Miller (15th overall)
 2012: Brady Skjei (28th overall)
 2013: none
 2014: none
 2015: none
 2016: none
 2017: Lias Andersson (7th overall) & Filip Chytil (21st)
 2018: Vitali Kravtsov (9th overall), K'Andre Miller (22nd) & Nils Lundkvist (28th)
 2019: Kaapo Kakko (2nd overall)
 2020: Alexis Lafreniere (1st overall) & Braden Schneider (19th)
 2021: Brennan Othmann (16th overall)
 2022: none

Hall of Famers
The New York Rangers acknowledge an affiliation with a number of inductees to the Hockey Hall of Fame. Rangers inductees include 53 former players and nine builders of the sport. The nine individuals recognized as builders by the Hall of Fame includes former Rangers executives, general managers, head coaches, and owners. In addition to players and builders, several broadcasters were also awarded the Foster Hewitt Memorial Award from the Hockey Hall of Fame. Sal Messina, a color commentator, was the first Rangers broadcaster to be awarded the Foster Hewitt Memorial Award. Other Rangers broadcasters awarded the Foster Hewitt Memorial Award include John Davidson (awarded in 2009), and Sam Rosen (awarded in 2016).

Retired numbers

The Rangers have retired nine numbers for eleven players in their history, and the NHL retired Wayne Gretzky's No. 99 for all its member teams at the 2000 NHL All-Star Game.

Notes:
 1 The number was retired in honor of two different players.

Single-season records

 Points: Jaromir Jagr (2005–06) – 123
 Goals: Jaromir Jagr (2005–06) – 54
 Assists: Brian Leetch (1991–92) – 80
 Power play goals: Chris Kreider (2021–22) – 26
 Power play points: Brian Leetch (1993–94) – 53
 Power play assists: Brian Leetch (1990–91) – 45
 Short-handed goals: Theoren Fleury (2000–01) – 7
 Short-handed points: Mark Messier (1996–97) – 11
 Short-handed assists: Mark Messier (1993–94) – 7

 Even strength goals: Jean Ratelle (1971–72) – 40
 Even strength points: Jean Ratelle (1971–72) – 82
 Even strength assists: Mark Messier (1991–92), Wayne Gretzky (1996–97), & Artemi Panarin (2019–20) – 46
 Game-winning goals: Chris Kreider (2021–22) – 11
 Overtime goals: Tomas Sandstrom (1986–87), Adam Graves (1998–99), & Marian Gaborik (2011–12) – 3
 Empty net goals: Michael Grabner (2017–18) – 7

 Plus/minus: Brad Park (1971–72) – +63 / Ron Greschner (1975–76) – -50
 Shots on goal: Jaromir Jagr (2005–06) – 368
 Penalty minutes: Troy Mallette (1989–90) – 305
 Goaltending wins: Mike Richter (1993–94) – 42
 Goaltending shutouts: John Ross Roach (1928–1929) – 13
 Goaltending saves: Gump Worsley (1955–1956) – 2376

All single-season records verifiable from: Official Site of the National Hockey League | NHL.com and  records.NHL.com

Franchise scoring leaders
These are the top-ten-point-scorers in franchise history. Figures are updated after each completed NHL regular season.

  – current Rangers player

See also
 Emile Francis Award
 Ice Hockey in Harlem

References
Footnotes

Citations

Bibliography
 
 
 
 
 
 
 
 
 Rangers' Biggest Trades Since 1990 (October 6, 2006)

External links

 
 Madison Square Garden
 MSG Network

 
National Hockey League teams
Rangers
Former Viacom subsidiaries
Metropolitan Division
Rangers
Ice hockey teams in the New York metropolitan area
Ice hockey clubs established in 1926
Madison Square Garden Sports